North Island College (NIC) North Island College (NIC), is a community college located primarily on Vancouver Island, British Columbia, Canada.

Starting as a distance educational institution in the 1970’s, NIC has grown to a comprehensive post-secondary institution with a range of academic and career-training programs from one-year certificates to four-year degrees and post-graduate studies.

History 
Established in 1975, North Island College’s mandate was to provide post-secondary education to 157,000 people spread across 80,000 km2 on Vancouver Island. 

In the 1970s, Dr. Dennis Wing and a handful of college administrators created BC’s first open college, hiring tutors to guide students through open learning courses in converted school buses, an ex-whaling boat— the Samarinda, and 24 learning centres across the region. Without Internet, satellite, or large-scale computer networks, students had opportunities to learn new skills and complete university degrees. NIC instructors, Dr. Michael Catchpole, Roger Albert, and others took to the airwaves delivering psychology and sociology courses to all of BC on the Knowledge Network while tutors such as Nigel and Adele Bailey drove the bumpy road to Woss Lake to tutor loggers and their families. 

In the 1990s, Dr. Neil Murphy and a small team of administrators developed infrastructure as NIC’s larger communities demanded local campuses and trades workshops. In 1990, the process of building physical campuses to serve the regions began. The Comox Valley campus on Ryan Road opened in 1992, followed by the Port Alberni campus in 1995, and the Campbell River campus in 1997. Fine arts, health, and trades programs were established to meet local demand, the first student association was formed, faculty and staff organized unions and full-time enrolment grew exponentially. 

In the 2000’s, Dr. Lou Dryden was tasked with strengthening NIC’s financial stability and forging new partnerships. Dryden established NIC’s first regional Indigenous advisory councils in consultation with 35 First Nations, allowing communities to identify their own program priorities, from bookkeeping and aquaculture to early childhood education. In 2019, Dryden’s contribution to NIC was recognized with the naming of the Dr. Lou Dryden Trades Training Atrium at NIC’s Comox Valley Campus’ Trades Training Centre. 

In 2009, Dr. Jan Lindsay arrived with a vision of NIC as a premier community and destination college. NIC’s international enrolment grew rapidly, creating new programs and degree pathways for students world-wide and opening doors for domestic students to travel abroad while earning NIC credentials. Under her leadership, the college created new university partnerships and developed research facilities.
John Bowman became NIC’s President in 2013. Through his tenure, NIC focused on further expanding the College’s facilities to increase the number of programs it could offer and the number of students it could serve. Of particular note are the $18-million expansion and renovation of NIC’s Campbell River campus, the signing of the agreement to make use of the former St. Joseph’s Hospital site for health and human services programs (NIC @ St. Joe’s) and the renaming of the Mixalakwila campus in Port Hardy. 

The College is currently led by Dr. Lisa Domae, who became President & CEO on April 12, 2021.

Campuses 
Within its 80,000 km² service area, NIC operates four campuses in the Comox Valley, Campbell River, Port Alberni, the Mix̱alakwila campus in Port Hardy and a regional learning centre in Ucluelet.

Comox Valley campus 

The Comox Valley campus, located in Courtenay, is NIC’s largest campus in terms of physical size, range of programming and number of students served. The campus is also home to the largest number of NIC employees as well as the College’s administrative centre. 

Amenities include a library and learning commons, Indigenous student lounge, bookstore, cafeteria, student lounge and childcare facilities. The Comox Valley Aquatic Centre, a swimming pool and fitness facility operated by the Comox Valley Regional District, and the nearby Comox Valley campus of the North Island Hospital are adjacent to NIC’s Comox Valley campus.  

Since opening at its current location in 1992, the campus has been steadily growing to accommodate student need. Additions have included the Shadbolt Fine Art studios (1996), Tyee Hall (2004) university studies and student amenity building, and the Trades Training Centre (2011) which uses 60% to 70% less energy than typical buildings of its size. In 2019, NIC @ St. Joe’s opened at the former St. Joseph’s General Hospital in Comox with classrooms, simulation labs and study space for students in health and human services programs including evening and weekend offerings. 

A campus highlight for 2020/21 was the announcement of funding from B.C.’s Ministry of Children and Family Development for 75 new licensed childcare spaces at the Beaufort Children’s Centre located on the Comox Valley campus.  The College also submitted an updated business case for proposed on-campus student housing to support the need for safe, affordable and accessible housing in the region. Plans incorporate universal design principles including a dedicated family housing building (improving access to education for students with children) and second single student building with non-gender specific room assignments, gender-neutral washrooms and a common area.

Campbell River campus

The Campbell River campus is NIC’s second largest campus and home to several programs, including trades and technology, health and human services, business, university studies, upgrading and continuing education and training. A five-year campus plan envisions the campus as a regional learning hub for Vancouver Island’s northern region with programming extending outward through digital delivery and regional in-community offerings.  
Originally opened in 1997 as an integrated facility with Timberline Secondary School, the campus was the site of a significant provincial and federal investment in 2018 to meet the education and training needs of the Campbell River community. The completed $17.6M expansion and renovation separates Timberline Secondary School and NIC into two distinct entities, creating almost 10,000 m² of new and renovated space for Heavy Duty Mechanic, Aircraft Structures and Professional Cook programs as well as a new library and learning commons, Indigenous lounge, bistro and lab facilities for health programs. In addition to new and renovated campus amenities, the campus also includes a bookstore and daycare.  

Construction on the Campbell River Indigenous Gathering Place began in 2020 fall. This new space will enhance support services for Indigenous students and the entire college community, promoting and preserving Indigenous culture and history in the spirit of reconciliation.

Port Alberni campus 

Constructed in 1994, the Port Alberni campus is NIC’s third largest campus, serving the Port Alberni area and Vancouver Island’s west coast region from the Roger Street campus and the offsite, trades-focused Tebo Vocational Centre.  Campus amenities include a library, bookstore, bistro and cafeteria, Indigenous gathering place and lounge, as well as a $1.35M teaching kitchen, completed in 2012, at the Roger Street campus. Future plans for the Port Alberni campus include a campus consolidation, combining the Roger Street and Tebo sites to provide centralized student services and supports for all students.

Mix̱alakwila campus in Port Hardy 

Mix̱alakwila campus is a busy learning hub in Mount Waddington region at the northernmost tip of Vancouver Island. The campus provides students in Port Hardy and surrounding communities the opportunity to access NIC services and a variety of adult upgrading, Indigenous language, early childhood care and education, health and human services, university transfer and continuing education courses and programs. The campus also supports in-community programming throughout the region when funding allows.

Ucluelet Centre 
The Ucluelet Centre provides vital service to the west coast region of Vancouver Island by allowing students to pursue education without leaving home and to be part of a supportive community of NIC instructors, support staff and fellow students. The centre provides classroom and technology-based access to health care, business, university transfer and adult basic education courses and programs.

Programs, partnerships and research

Programs

NIC offers 120 credit programs and pathways and just under 900 individual courses. The majority of NIC’s offerings are one- and two-year certificate and diploma programs that provide learners with pathways to further education and employment in areas such as foundation trades and apprenticeships, resource trades, technology, engineering, culinary arts, health and human services, early childhood care and education, business, office administration, tourism, adventure guiding, digital design and development and fine arts. 

University studies, including university dual admission and pathway programs, are key to providing the NIC region’s learners with access to degree programs. 

NIC also offers four-year applied degrees in business administration as well as a Bachelor of Science in Nursing in partnership with Vancouver Island University. 

With funding from the Ministry of Advanced Education and Skills Training, NIC began offering micro-credentials in 2020/21 - specific, short-term learning opportunities designed to facilitate learners' employment goals and/or to ladder into further education, including reskilling and upskilling.

Indigenous education

Indigenous education is a key focus area for NIC with 13% the NIC service area’s population being indigenous peoples (compared with 6% for the province) and 21% of NIC’s domestic student population 
(19% of domestic FTEs) of self-declared Aboriginal ancestry. Indigenous education at NIC is informed and guided by three central documents: 1) the TRC Calls to Action; 2) the UN Declaration on the Rights of Indigenous Peoples; and, 3) the CICan Indigenous Education Protocol for Colleges and Institutes. Since 2015, the College has grown its Indigenous-centred supports and services, expanding priority admission to students with Indigenous ancestry in several health and human services programs. 

Elders in Residence at every campus support employees and students in their own communities and are integrated into academic programs.

Partnerships 

NIC is among the most active post-secondary institutions in B.C. seeking collaborations and partnerships with secondary and post-secondary institutions to facilitate the transition of students from the K-12 system to post-secondary education and training. The College has made it a priority to expand domestic and international educational pathways and opportunities for students. Community and industry partnership development is ongoing and remains crucial to ensuring program access and relevance for remote learners and local economies.
  
NIC currently has over 80 active partnership agreements, enabling students to transfer seamlessly from NIC to the University of Victoria, Vancouver Island University, the University of British Columbia and universities around the world.6  NIC’s work with partner institutions through B.C., Canada and beyond, as well as with the  British Columbia Council on Admissions & Transfer (BCCAT) is focused on supporting student access to higher education.

Applied research
 
NIC’s applied research initiatives have grown in recent years through the work of the Centre for Applied Research, Technology and Innovation (CARTI),7 created in 2012 to match students and staff with opportunities to work on challenges proposed by local business.  CARTI has secured more than $3.7M in project funding since its inception, supporting 43 projects with 71 paid student researchers and engaging with 62 partner businesses and organizations.  
Applied research at NIC provides exceptional opportunities for students and staff to apply their skills to address challenges identified by local business, industry, not-for-profit and community groups. Innovative and collaborative community projects provide students with hands-on experience in applying knowledge gained in the classroom to real-world challenges. Faculty researchers benefit from opportunities to engage with stakeholders and remain current with new developments in their area of expertise. 

These practical and innovative projects also support economic growth and social improvement. NIC’s research partners utilize the expertise of students and staff to innovate in the creation of new products, processes and ideas. Community partners are provided with an opportunity to see the breadth of skills and expertise of NIC students and build relationships with those who may be candidates for future employment.

Strategic direction

Build 2026

Dr. Lisa Domae was appointed NIC’s sixth President and Chief Executive Officer on April 12, 2021 and, since then, has worked to finalize NIC’s 2021-2026 strategic plan, BUILD 2026, which received Board of Governors approval on May 27th. BUILD is founded on the values and core ideas heard in the NIC region in 2019 and 2020; integrates the learnings of the fall 2020 academic plan, Widening Our Doorways -COVID 19 & a 10-Point Plan to Reset, Reshape and Renew Learning at NIC; 16 and, is informed by ongoing discussions with students, employees, and communities - including through the engage.nic.bc.ca portal. The consultation has informed every aspect of the plan – including renewed vision and mission statements for NIC.   

Working with NIC’s Indigenous Education Council and NIC’s Director of Indigenous Education, the NIC college community is grateful to co-launch BUILD with the first indigenization plan in NIC history, Working Together – North Island College Indigenization Plan 2021-2026, 17 on June 21st, National Indigenous Day. The two plans will work in tandem during the next five years as the College works toward lasting and meaningful reconciliation.
  
BUILD 2026, Widening our Doorways and Working Together, along with companion plans for international education and adult basic education, represent NIC’s commitment to keep listening and responding with educational programs, services and delivery methods that meet students and communities where they are now and support them in getting where they want to be in the future.  Aligned with government priorities to support British Columbians through the pandemic and economic recovery, especially those impacted by COVID-19 and vulnerable and underrepresented groups, they provide a framework for working with the Ministry, communities, employers and industry to implement post-secondary education and skills training leading to rewarding career opportunities in high priority occupations.

NIC Foundation 

Established in 1991 in partnership with NIC, the NIC Foundation supports NIC students through scholarships and bursaries, equips classrooms with current technology and ensures the best possible learning facilities are accessible on the Central and North Island. It envisions a future where every student has the opportunity to pursue post‐secondary education, train for a new career or develop employable skills to support themselves and their families.

See also
List of institutes and colleges in British Columbia
List of universities in British Columbia
Higher education in British Columbia
Education in Canada

References

External links
North Island College

Colleges in British Columbia
Campbell River, British Columbia
Courtenay, British Columbia
Port Alberni